Frances Foy (April 11, 1890 – 1963) was an American painter, muralist, illustrator, and etcher born in Chicago, Illinois.

Career
Foy began studying art with Wellington J. Reynolds at the Chicago Academy of Fine Arts and later attended the School of the Art Institute of Chicago where she continued studying with Reynolds as well as with George Bellows and Fred Schook. Foy completed commercial work and began to exhibit her work in many venues in the 1920s, including Chicago No-Jury Society of Artists, Chicago Woman's Aid, the Romany Club, and the Art Institute of Chicago. She and other classmates were active in Chicago's progressive movement in the 1920s and 1930s. In 1928, she and husband Gustaf Dalstrom traveled with other artists to Europe, where she was directly exposed to European modernists. She was a member of the Chicago Society of Artists and served on the technical committee of the Federal Public Works of Art Project.

Family life
She married fellow artist and her mentor, Gustaf Dalstrom, in 1923. They settled in the Lincoln Park area of Chicago and often painted scenes of community life, including the Lincoln Park Zoo and neighborhood schoolchildren.

Murals

Foy receive commissions for murals through the Section of Painting and Sculpture, later called the Section of Fine Arts, of the United States  Treasury Department. In 1943, Foy painted two murals in the West Allis, Wisconsin post office, Wisconsin Wild Flowers – Spring and  Wisconsin Wild Flowers – Autumn.

References

1890 births
1963 deaths
American women painters
Modern painters
School of the Art Institute of Chicago alumni
American muralists
American women illustrators
American illustrators
American etchers
American women printmakers
20th-century American painters
20th-century American women artists
Women muralists
Section of Painting and Sculpture artists
20th-century American printmakers
Women etchers